Alafia is an unincorporated community in southeastern Hillsborough County, Florida,  United States, between Plant City and Lithia near the intersection of Keysville Road (county road 676) and Florida State Road 39.

History
Alafia is one of Hillsborough County's oldest communities, dating to circa 1842 when Prussian immigrants, including Antoine Wordehoff, settled in the area, soon to be joined by a number of families under the auspices of the Armed Occupation Act. An armed garrison for monitoring the Seminoles was established in 1849, and settlers soon followed. By 1970 the community comprised 442 people.

Education
The community of Alafia is served by Hillsborough County Schools.

References

Unincorporated communities in Hillsborough County, Florida
Unincorporated communities in Florida